Dante Morandi (born 24 February 1958) is an Italian racing cyclist. He won stage 4 of the 1980 Giro d'Italia.

References

External links
 

1958 births
Living people
Italian male cyclists
Italian Giro d'Italia stage winners
Place of birth missing (living people)
Sportspeople from the Metropolitan City of Florence
Cyclists from Tuscany